"Yana Yana" (in Arabic يانا يانا) is a famous Arabic language song in Egyptian Arabic by the Lebanese pan-Arab singer Sabah.

Lyrics are written by Morsy Jamil Aziz and music is by Baligh Hamdi. The song enjoys huge popularity in the Arab World.

There was a remake of the song as a duet between Sabah and newcomer Rola Saad.

References

Arabic-language songs
2009 songs